Thomas W. White (born October 31, 1937) was a Michigan politician.

Early life
White was born on October 31, 1937 in Detroit, Michigan.

Education
White attended the University of Michigan. White earned a B.A. from Wayne State University in history and did graduate work in sociology.

Career
On November 4, 1964, White was elected to the Michigan House of Representatives where he represented the 11th district from January 1, 1965 to January 1, 1969. After his time in the legislature, White became an administrative assistant for the Michigan House Development Authority. White was a member of the NAACP and the American Civil Liberties Union.

Personal life
In 1964, White married Judith Maxon.

References

1937 births
Politicians from Detroit
University of Michigan alumni
Wayne State University alumni
Democratic Party members of the Michigan House of Representatives
20th-century American politicians
Living people